The 2002–03 NCAA football bowl games were a series of 28 post-season games (including the Bowl Championship Series) played in December 2002 and January 2003 for Division I-A football teams and their all-stars. The post-season began with the New Orleans Bowl on December 17, 2002, and concluded on February 1, 2003, with the season-ending Hula Bowl.

A new record of 28 team-competitive bowls, and two all-star games, were played, including the inaugural Continental Tire Bowl, Hawaii Bowl and San Francisco Bowl. To fill the 56 available team-competitive bowl slots, a total of three teams with non-winning seasons participated in bowl games—all three had a .500 (6–6) season.

Poll rankings
The below table lists top teams (per polls taken after the completion of the regular season and any conference championship games), their win–loss records (prior to bowl games), and the bowls they later played in. The AP column represents rankings per the AP Poll, while the BCS column represents the Bowl Championship Series rankings.

 denotes a BCS bowl game
 ineligible for bowl play due to NCAA sanctions

Schedule

All-star games

References